Piz Ault is a mountain of the Glarus Alps, located south of the Oberalpstock in Switzerland.

Three ridges lead to the peak with a fourth one not very distinct to the south. The frontier between the Canton of Uri and the Canton of Graubünden lies on the eastern and the northern ridge, making it a three-quarter Graubünden mountain. The municipalities are Disentis and Sedrun on the south and Silenen to the northeast. There is no path leading onto the peak for hikers. In winter time the area is accessible by a T-Bar ski lift which reaches up to some 200 meters under its peak in its southwestern face. The ski resort  is accessible from Disentis, lying south of Piz Ault in the State (Canton) of Graubünden.

References

External links
Piz Ault on Hikr

Mountains of the Alps
Alpine three-thousanders
Mountains of Switzerland
Mountains of Graubünden
Mountains of the canton of Uri
Graubünden–Uri border
Tujetsch
Disentis